Kozlovka is a rural locality (a selo) and the administrative center of Kozlovskoye Rural Settlement, Buturlinovsky District, Voronezh Oblast, Russia. The population was 3,137 as of 2010. There are 41 streets.

Geography 
Kozlovka is located 13 km northwest of Buturlinovka (the district's administrative centre) by road. Zemledelets is the nearest rural locality.

References 

Rural localities in Buturlinovsky District